Bassaniodes robustus is a ground crab spider species found from Europe to Central Asia.

It is recorded in the fauna list of Parley Common, a Site of Special Scientific Interest in Dorset, England.

Taxonomy
The species was first described in 1832 as Thomisus robustus. It was transferred to the genus Xysticus by Eugène Simon in  1875 and then to Bassaniodes in 2019.

References

Thomisidae
Spiders of Europe
Spiders of Russia
Spiders of Asia
Spiders described in 1832